Veljko Mršić (born 13 April 1971) is a Croatian professional basketball coach and former player, who is currently the head coach of the Río Breogán of the Spanish Liga ACB.

Playing career 
Mršić was a member of the FIBA European Selection team in 1995.

National team career 
Mršić was a member of the Croatia men's national basketball team, which won bronze medals at the 1994 World Championship, 1993 EuroBasket and at the 1995 EuroBasket. He was also on the squad for the 1996 Summer Olympic Games, 1999 EuroBasket and for the 2001 EuroBasket.

Coaching career

Split (2006) 
Mršić started his head coaching career with his hometown club Split. On 15 June 2006, he was named head coach of the club, but following a series of poor results in the NLB League, he was sacked on 13 December 2006.

Varese (2007–2008) 
Following the dismissal at his hometown, Mršić was appointed head coach for Pallacanestro Varese of the Italian Serie A on 13 June 2007.

Cedevita (2011–2012, 2013–2017) 
In 2011 Mršić was named head coach of the Cedevita junior team, with which he celebrated winning the 2012 Croatian championship title. Later he worked as an assistant coach under Cedevita head coach Jasmin Repeša, who left the club due to health reasons in June 2015 when Mršić succeeded him as the new head coach of the senior team.

In Mršić's inaugural season with Cedevita, the club won the Croatian League title and reached the playoffs of the ABA League.

In the following season, Cedevita again won the national league title, but lost the ABA League playoffs final game tie to Serbian team Crvena zvezda. In May 2017 Mršić was fired from Cedevita and replaced by renowned Slovenian coach Jure Zdovc.

Cibona (2012) 
On 11 June 2012, Mršić was named head coach of Cibona. He signed a three-year deal, but on 26 November 2012, he was sacked.

Bilbao Basket (2017–2018) 
On 27 November 2017, Mršić was named head coach of the Spanish Liga ACB team Bilbao Basket. On 30 April 2018, he parted ways with the Spanish team, which was then taken by Slovenian coach Jaka Lakovič.

Zadar (2020–2021) 
On 25 June 2020, Mršić was named head coach of Croatian club Zadar. In his inaugural season at the club, he celebrated winning the national cup title in February 2021. 

In June 2021 Mršić led Zadar to win the national league title, for the first time since the 2007–08 season. In July 2021, he left Zadar.

Río Breogán (2022–present) 
On January 20, 2022, he has signed with Río Breogán of the Liga ACB.

Coaching record

EuroLeague 

|- 
| align="left"|Cedevita
| align="left"|2015–16
| 10 || 4 || 6 ||  || align="center"|Eliminated in Top 16 stage
|-class="sortbottom"
| align="center" colspan=2|Career||10||4||6||||

National team coaching

Croatia (2019–2022) 
On 2 May 2019, the Croatian Basketball Federation announced Mršić was appointed head coach of the Croatian national basketball team.

Mršić debuted at Croatia bench at the 2019 NBA Summer League, while in July he celebrated winning the Stanković Cup title in China.

On 5 February 2020, Mršić published the roster for the 2022 EuroBasket qualifiers, bringing back two experienced players, Krunoslav Simon and Roko Ukić, on the national squad. On 21 and 24 February, Croatia opened qualifiers with two consecutive wins, against Sweden (72–56) and the Netherlands (69–59). On 29 November 2020, Croatia secured its place in the finals with a 87–72 victory over Sweden. On 20 January 2022, Mršić left his post as the national head coach.

Awards and accomplishments 
Club titles that Mršić won as a senior level player:
Croatian League Champion: 
1993, 1994, 1995, 1998
Lithuanian League Champion: 
1997
Italian League Champion: 
1999
FIBA Korać Cup Champion: 
2000–01
Croatian Cup Winner: 
1995

Club titles that Mršić won as a head coach:
Croatian League Champion: (with Cedevita: 2014–15, 2015–16, 2016–17; with Zadar: 2020–21)
Croatian Cup Winner: (with Cedevita: 2015–16, 2016–17; with Zadar: 2020–21)

References

External links 
Euroleague.net Player Profile
Euroleague.net Coach Profile
FIBA Player Profile
FIBA Europe Player Profile
Spanish League Player Profile 
Italian League Player Profile 

1971 births
Living people
1994 FIBA World Championship players
Baloncesto Málaga players
Basketball players at the 1996 Summer Olympics
BC Kyiv players
BC Žalgiris players
CB Girona players
CB Granada players
Croatian basketball coaches
Croatian expatriate basketball people in Spain
Croatian expatriate basketball people in Turkey
Croatian men's basketball players
KK Cibona players
KK Cedevita coaches
KK Split players
Liga ACB players
Olimpia Milano players
Olympiacos B.C. players
Olympic basketball players of Croatia
Pallacanestro Varese players
Shooting guards
Small forwards
Basketball players from Split, Croatia
Ülker G.S.K. basketball players
KK Zadar coaches